Mikro Dereio is a village and a community in the central part of the Evros regional unit in Greece. It is situated on the left bank of the river Erythropotamos, in the Eastern Rhodope Mountains. The border with Bulgaria is 5 km to the north. Mikro Dereio is on the Greek National Road 53. In 2011 its population was 158 for the settlement and 1,903 for the community, making it the most populous community of the municipal unit of Orfeas. The community consists of the villages Mikro Dereio, Geriko, Goniko, Mega Dereio, Petrolofos, Roussa and Sidirochori.

Population

History

The village was founded by the Ottoman Turks in the 14th century, it was known as Malak Dervent (Малък Дервент) in Bulgarian.  According to Anastas Razbojnikov, its 1830 population was 210 Bulgarian families/houses, 256 in 1878, 220 in 1912 of which 200 were Bulgarian exarchists.  According to professor Lyubomir Miletich, the 1912 population was around 200 Bulgarian families. After a brief period of Bulgarian rule between 1913 and 1919, it became part of Greece.

Person

Angel Popkirov (Ангел Попкиров, 1881-1968), Bulgarian revolutionary leader, member of VMORO

See also
List of settlements in the Evros regional unit

External links
Mega Dereio on GTP Travel Pages

References

Populated places in Evros (regional unit)